Corey Lemard Mays (born November 27, 1983, in Chicago, in the U.S. state of Illinois) is a former American football linebacker. He was signed by the New England Patriots as an undrafted free agent in 2006. He played college football at Notre Dame. Mays has also played for the Cincinnati Bengals and the Kansas City Chiefs.

Early years
Mays earned All City, All Area and All State honors as a Senior. Mays capped off his senior year with the 2001 Gatorade Player of The Year honors for Illinois.
Mays played high school football at Morgan Park High School in Chicago. Mays accepted a full scholarship offer to the University of Notre Dame, which was the first offer to a public league athlete since Chris Zorch.

Professional career

New England Patriots
Mays was first signed as an undrafted free agent out of the University of Notre Dame after the 2006 NFL Draft. He started the 2006 season as a member of the New England Patriots practice squad, but was later signed to the active roster. He was cut by the Patriots on October 1, 2007.

Cincinnati Bengals
Mays signed with the Cincinnati Bengals on October 2, 2007, and went on to play two seasons with the team. He was non-tendered as a restricted free agent in the 2009 offseason.

Kansas City Chiefs
Mays was signed by the Kansas City Chiefs on March 13, 2009.

References

External links
Cincinnati Bengals bio
Kansas City Chiefs bio
New England Patriots bio
Notre Dame Fighting Irish bio

1983 births
Living people
Players of American football from Chicago
American football linebackers
Notre Dame Fighting Irish football players
New England Patriots players
Cincinnati Bengals players
Kansas City Chiefs players